Lichenomphalia chromacea is a species of basidiolichen in the family Hygrophoraceae. It is found in southern Australia. The thallus of the lichen is a greenish, granular layer of fungal hyphae and algae on the soil around the base of the stipe.

Taxonomy
The species was first scientifically described as a new species by John Burton Cleland, based on specimens collected from South Australia. In 1978, Scott Redhead and Thomas Kuyper transferred it to the genus Botrydina, and a year later—following changes to the rules for botanical nomenclature—to Phytoconis. Both of these genera have since been synonymized with Lichenomphalia. Tom May and Alec Wood proposed it be classified in Omphalina in 1995. In 2002, the basidiolichen genus Lichenomphalia was circumscribed, and this species was one of several that were transferred to it.

Description

The basidia are usually four-spored, but very rarely they are two-spored. The basidiospores are hyaline, ellipsoid, and measure 6.4–10.4 by 3.4–6.2 μm. The thallus of the lichen is disc-shaped to angular, measuring 200–900 μm broad and forming a green, crust-like surface when crowded together.

Habitat and distribution
Lichenomphalia chromacea occurs in South Australia, New South Wales, and Tasmania. It fruits in clusters on the ground, or occasionally on bark, and often amongst mosses. In Tasmania, it is typically encountered in sandy or peaty soil in heathland and woodland, and usually at  higher elevations. The only other members of genus Lichenomphalia that occur in Australia are L. tasmanica and L. umbellifera.

References

Hygrophoraceae
Lichen species
Lichens described in 1924
Lichens of Australia
Taxa named by John Burton Cleland
Basidiolichens